The 2015 NCAA Division III football season, part of the college football season organized by the NCAA at the Division III level in the United States, began on September 5, 2015 and concluded with the NCAA Division III Football Championship, also known as the Stagg Bowl, on December 18, 2015 at Salem Football Stadium in Salem, Virginia. Mount Union, which made its 11th consecutive appearance in the title game, defeated St. Thomas (Minnesota) 49–35 to claim its 19th national title.

Conference changes and new programs
One school added football at the Division III level and eight programs changed conference affiliations.

A full list of Division III teams can be viewed on the D3football website.

Conference standings

Conference summaries
Conferences highlighted in yellow do not receive automatic bids to the 2015 playoffs.

Postseason

Twenty-five conferences met the requirements for an automatic ("Pool A") bid to the playoffs. Besides the NESCAC, which does not participate in the playoffs, two conferences had no Pool A bid. The American Southwest, which had fallen below the required seven members in 2013, lost its Pool A bid after the two-year grace period; the SCAC had only four members. The MASCAC and SAA gained Pool A bids for the first time, having passed through the two-year waiting period.

Schools not in Pool A conferences were eligible for Pool B. The number of Pool B bids was determined by calculating the ratio of Pool A conferences to schools in those conferences and applying that ratio to the number of Pool B schools. The 25 Pool A conferences contained 220 schools, an average of 8.8 teams per conference. Twelve schools were in Pool B, enough for one bid.

The remaining six playoff spots were at-large ("Pool C") teams.

Playoff bracket

* Home team    † Overtime    Winner

Bowl games

See also
2015 NCAA Division III football rankings
2015 NCAA Division I FBS football season
2015 NCAA Division I FCS football season
2015 NCAA Division II football season

References